The 2004–05 Spartan South Midlands Football League season is the 8th in the history of Spartan South Midlands Football League a football competition in England.

Premier Division

The Premier Division featured 16 clubs which competed in the division last season, along with four clubs, promoted from Division One:
Haywood United
Langford
Tring Athletic
Welwyn Garden City

League table

Division One

Division One featured eleven clubs which competed in the division last season, along with six new clubs.

Five clubs, promoted from Division Two:
Amersham Town
Arlesey Athletic
Cranfield United
Kentish Town
Winslow United
One club, joined from the Herts County League:
Oxhey Jets

League table

Division Two

Division Two featured twelve clubs which competed in the division last season, along with four new clubs:
Dunstable Town 98, new club
Kings Langley, relegated from Division One
Pitstone & Ivinghoe United, relegated from Division One
The 61, relegated from Division One

Also, Old Dunstablians changed name to AFC Dunstable and Abbey National changed name to Loughton Orient.

League table

References

External links
 FCHD Spartan South Midlands Football League page

2004–05
9